3rd Panzer Division may refer to:

 3rd Panzer Division (Wehrmacht)
 3rd Panzer Division (Bundeswehr)
 3rd SS Panzer Division Totenkopf